Eubazus is a genus of braconid wasps in the family Braconidae. There are at least 140 described species in Eubazus.

See also
 List of Eubazus species

References

Further reading

External links

 

Parasitic wasps